Valley Mills Municipal Airport  is a city-owned public airport in Valley Mills, McLennan County, Texas, United States, located approximately  southeast of the central business district. The airport has no IATA or ICAO designation. 

The airport is used solely for general aviation purposes.

Facilities 
 Runway 6/24: 3,028 x 40 ft. (922 x 12 m), Surface: Turf
 Runway 14/32: 2,788 x 40 ft. (850 x 12 m), Surface: Turf

For the 12-month period ending 28 February 2016, the airport had 50 aircraft operations, an average of less than one per day: 100% general aviation. At that time there were no aircraft based at this airport.

References

External links 
  at Texas DOT Airport Directory

Airports in Texas
Transportation in McLennan County, Texas